Jacob Osano Ogada is Kenyan goalkeeper currently in the ranks of Kenyan Premier League side Nairobi City Stars.

Club career

Osano joined KCB in 2017 to the end of the 2018 season. In 2019 he rejoined Nairobi Stima then moved to Nairobi City Stars at the start of the year 2020 on a two-and-a-half-year contract. 

He made his premier league debut against Kenya Police on 16 Oct 2021 in Kasarani, and has so far tended goal in 26 of 30 games in the 2021/22 topflight season.

Honors

Club
KCB
 National Super League champion: 2018
Nairobi City Stars
 National Super League champion: 2019/20

References

1994 births
Living people
Kenyan footballers
Kenyan Premier League players
Wazito F.C. players
Nairobi City Stars players
Kenya Commercial Bank S.C.  players